The Rathaus in Zürich, Switzerland is Zürich's Town Hall. The Rathaus was built from 1694-1698. It served as the seat of government and administration of the Republic of Zürich until 1798. The canton of Zürich owns it since 1803, and it houses both legislative chambers, the cantonal parliament as well as the City Parliament. It must be distinguished from the Stadthaus (City Hall), which is the seat of the city's executive government, the City Council and its administration.

History 

It is built on a fundament (foundation) anchored in the river Limmat and faces the Limmatquai (pedestrian area) at a pedestrian bridge, or the Rathausbrücke. The 17th century building replaces an earlier Rathaus (city council chambers) built in 1397, which in turn replaced a 13th-century court house (Richthus).
 
Rathaus is also the name of a quarter within the Altstadt district. It is an integral part of the medieval town on the right side of the Limmat, separated by the Hirschengraben from the Hochschulen quarter uphill to the east, and delimited by the Bellevue and Central squares to the south and north, respectively.

Literature 
 Christian Renfer: Schweizerische Kunstführer GSK, Band 637/638: Das Rathaus in Zürich, Bern 1998, 
 Konrad Escher: Die Kunstdenkmäler des Kantons Zürich. Bd. IV: Die Stadt Zürich, Erster Teil. Birkhäuser: Basel 1939, S. 319–360.

Gallery

See also

References

Altstadt (Zürich)
City and town halls in Switzerland